Rachid Taha is the second solo album by Rachid Taha after he left the group Carte de Séjour. It was produced by Steve Hillage and Justin Robertson; and was first released in 1993.

The album contains Taha’s song "Voilà Voilà", which was released as a dance-oriented single that was a  hit with English DJs; and his version of Ya Rayah, the classic chaâbi song  composed by Dahmane El Harrachi (real name Abderrahmane Amrani). Taha returns to these songs in later albums.

A video clip was later made for "Ya Rayah" Taha and Bruno Maman co-wrote "Indie (1+1+1)", which was released as a single in 1995 and for which a video clip was also made.

Track listing
 Yamess
 Malika
 Voilà Voilà
 Hitiste
 D'Abord D'Abord
 Indie (Instrumental)
 Hasard
 Dinaha
 Ya Rayah
 Woulla
 Menek
 Laisse Moi
 Yamess (Instrumental)
 Voilà Voilà (Justin Robertson Vocal Edit)
 Indie (Vocal Version/ 1+1+1...)

Personnel
 Rachid Taha - Programming, Vocals
 Steve Hillage - Bass, Effects, Guitar, Keyboards, Mixing, Producer, Programming 
 Nabil Khalidi - Banjo, Bendire, Oud, Percussion, Programming
 Pete Davies - Keyboards, Piano 
 Hossam Ramzy - Percussion 
 Jah Wobble - Bass
 Geoff Richardson - Cello, Viola, Violin 
 Justin Robertson - Producer, Remixing 
 Aniff Cousins - Vocals 
 Blair Booth - Vocals 
 Bruno Maman - Vocals 
 Miquette Giraudy - Background vocals
 Pinise Saul - Background vocals
 Pepsi DeMacque - Background vocals 
 Rachel Des Bois - Background vocals
 Satya Sai - Background vocals 
 Sonti Mndebele - Background vocals

Source:

References

External links
Official website

1993 albums
Rachid Taha albums
Albums produced by Steve Hillage